Pats Croft Eyot is a small island in the River Thames in England on the reach above Bell Weir Lock, near Wraysbury, Berkshire and Runnymede, Surrey. The island is privately owned and is inhabited.

See also
Islands in the River Thames

Islands of the River Thames